Homeobox protein Hox-D13 is a protein that in humans is encoded by the HOXD13 gene. This gene belongs to the homeobox family of genes. The homeobox genes encode a highly conserved family of transcription factors that play an important role in morphogenesis in all multicellular organisms.

Mammals possess four similar homeobox gene clusters, HOXA, HOXB, HOXC and HOXD, located on different chromosomes, consisting of 9–11 genes arranged in tandem. HOXD13 is the first of several HOXD genes located in a cluster on chromosome 2. Deletions that remove the entire HOXD gene cluster or the 5' end of this cluster have been associated with severe limb and genital abnormalities. The product of the mouse Hoxd13 gene plays a role in axial skeleton development and forelimb morphogenesis.

Changes in the expression of the Hoxd13 gene in early lobe-finned fish may have also contributed to the evolution of the tetrapod limb. Experiments investigating the impact of 5′ Hoxd overexpression in zebrafish embryos observed modified development of distal fin structures, resulting in increased proliferation, distal expansion of cartilage tissue and fin fold reduction. A number of similar studies conducted with a range of animals, including catsharks and marsupials, lend further credibility to the role of the Hoxd13 gene in the fin-to-limb transition.

Clinical significance 
Mutations in HOXD13 can cause several types of autosomal dominant syndactyly and brachydactyly, including brachydactyly type D ("club thumb"), brachydactyly type E, syndactyly type 5 and synpolydactyly type 1.

See also 
 Homeobox

References

Further reading

External links 
 

Transcription factors